Self-sovereign identity (SSI) is an approach to digital identity that gives individuals control over the information they use to prove who they are to websites, services, and applications across the web. Without SSI, individuals with persistent accounts (identities) across the internet must rely on a number of large identity providers, such as Facebook (Facebook Connect) and Google (Google Sign-In), that have control of the information associated with their identity. If a user chooses not to use a large identity provider, then they have to create new accounts with each service provider, which fragments their web experiences. Self-sovereign identity offers a way to avoid these two undesirable alternatives. In a self-sovereign identity system, the user accesses services in a streamlined and secure manner, while maintaining control over the information associated with their identity.

Background 
The TCP/IP protocol provides identifiers for machines, but not for the people and organisations operating the machines. This makes the network-level identifiers on the internet hard to trust and rely on for information and communication for a number of reasons: 1) hackers can easily change a computer’s hardware or IP address, 2) services provide identifiers for the user, not the network. The absence of reliable identifiers is one of the primary sources of cybercrime, fraud, and threats to privacy on the internet.

With the advent of blockchain technology, a new model for decentralized identity emerged in 2015. The FIDO Alliance proposed an identity model that was no longer account-based, but identified people through direct, private, peer-to-peer connections secured by public/private key cryptography. Self-Sovereign Identity (SSI) summarises all components of the decentralized identity model: digital wallets, digital credentials, and digital connections.

Technical aspects 
SSI addresses the difficulty of establishing trust in an interaction. In order to be trusted, one party in an interaction will present credentials to the other parties, and those relying on parties can verify that the credentials came from an issuer that they trust. In this way, the verifier's trust in the issuer is transferred to the credential holder. This basic structure of SSI with three participants is sometimes called "the trust triangle".

It is generally recognized that for an identity system to be self-sovereign, users control the verifiable credentials that they hold and their consent is required to use those credentials. This reduces the unintended sharing of users' personal data. This is contrasted with the centralized identity paradigm where identity is provided by some outside entity.

In an SSI system, holders generate and control unique identifiers called decentralized identifiers. Most SSI systems are decentralized, where the credentials are managed using crypto wallets and verified using public-key cryptography anchored on a distributed ledger. The credentials may contain data from an issuer's database, a social media account, a history of transactions on an e-commerce site, or attestation from friends or colleagues.

National digital identity systems

European Union 

The European Union is exploring decentralized digital identity through a number of initiatives including the International Association for Trusted Blockchain Application (INATBA) , the EU Blockchain Observatory & Forum and the European SSI Framework. The EU recently created an eIDAS compatible European Self-Sovereign Identity Framework (ESSIF). The ESSIF makes use of decentralized identifiers (DIDs) and the European Blockchain Services Infrastructure (EBSI).

Korea 
The Korean government created a public/private consortia specifically for decentralized identity.

References

See also 
 Decentralized identifier
 Decentralized web
 Digital self-determination

Authentication methods
Computer access control
Digital technology
Federated identity
Identity management
Sovereignty